James Hood Wright (known professionally as J. Hood Wright; November 4, 1836 – November 12, 1894) was an American banker, financier, corporate director, business magnate, and reorganizer of US railroads. He began as a bookkeeper but his management talents led him to  becoming a partner in J. P. Morgan's banking firms. He sat on the board of directors for, and reorganized, several railroads. He facilitated investment in Thomas Edison's electrical enterprises and technology. Wright became wealthy in his business operations and was known as a philanthropist in New York City. At the time of his death, interest in his finances set off national media reporting on the size and disposition of his estate.

Early life 
Wright was born in Philadelphia, United States, on November 2, 1836, to William and Sarah Wright ( Hood). He was educated in the Philadelphia public school system and, as a teenager, became a dry-goods clerk, a position he held for several years.

Career

Drexel, Morgan and Company
In his early twenties, Wright became a clerk at the Philadelphia banking firm, Drexel and Company, where a talent for bookkeeping led to rapid promotions. He was named a partner around 1864. He excelled in detecting counterfeit money and was given the responsibility to review and identify ersatz currency. Wright moved to New York City to work for Drexel, Morgan and Company, the successor firm of Drexel and Company. Pierpont became fed up with the youngest Drexel brother, Joseph, and was heartened when the Drexels suggested Wright as a potential partner, whom he found "...competent, quick, accurate and a ‘capital negotiator.’" Fearful that losing Joseph would alienate the Drexel family, Pierpont was relieved when Joseph retired that year, allowing him to begin his long association with Wright. 

Wright was one of only six partners in the banking firm. In order to become partner, Wright provided a $10,000 investment into the company in exchange for 5% of the company's net profits. By 1884, the value of partners' shares had grown, and Wright's share was worth $1 million. He would keep his investment in the bank until his death. Wright became involved in the management of, as well as invested in, many of the corporations for whom Drexel Morgan provided banking services.

Director 

Wright was one of a small number of shareholders in a syndicate formed to finance Edison's electric light project to illuminate Manhattan. 
From 1880 to his death, he was banking director of the Edison Electric Illuminating Company and other Thomas Edison companies in financing development of electrical apparatus devices and power distribution technology. Edison's company was profitable for its investors, showing net income rising from $229,000 in 1890 to $606,000 in 1893; paying $451,000 in dividends to Wright and his fellow shareholders in 1893. Edison secretly gave Wright and Morgan shares to Edison Machine Works for being the bankers to his Electric Illuminating Company.

According to the New York Times, Wright enjoyed a reputation as "one of the most widely known bankers and railroad reorganizers" in the United States. He was a director for the Chicago, Milwaukee and St. Paul Railroad; the Southern Railway; the Long Island Rail Road; and the New York Guaranty and Indemnity Company. The Long Island Rail Road and its leased lines proved exceptionally prosperous and a source of profit under his management and direction. Wright was mostly responsible for the reorganization of the Philadelphia and Reading Railroad. Just prior to his death, he was focused on the Richmond and West Point Terminal Railway and Warehouse Company and all the subsidiary railroads the Richmond Railway controlled. He also served as president of the Suburban Rapid Transit Road, overseeing its conversion to an elevated railroad system. He served as a director of the West Shore Railroad and director of the Chicago-based Elgin, Joliet and Eastern Railway Co.

First home with electric lighting

An electric lighting system with its own generator, manufactured by Mitchell, Vance and Co. under the direction of Thomas Edison, was installed at Wright's residence in New York City. This was reported as the first private residence to be lighted by the Edison incandescent system, and also the first to be powered by a generator on the premises. A conflicting claim states that the first private residence in the US lighted by incandescent electricity (generated by hydro-electric power) was the Hearthstone home in Appleton WI.

Personal life and death

Wright married Mary P. Robinson at Philadelphia's Arch Street Methodist Episcopal Church on March 1, 1881. She was the widow of John M. Robinson, his partner at Drexel, Morgan & Co. The newly wedded couple honeymooned in Washington D.C. in a specially-provided private railroad car.

Wright was president of the Manhattan Hospital. He held memberships in the Metropolitan Club, the City Club, the Riding Club, the New York Yacht Club and the Metropolitan Museum of New York. He was associated with the Republican Party and worshipped at the Presbyterian Church.

In January 1894, he was diagnosed with cardiac disease and partially retired from his work at Drexel Morgan. That summer he spent time cruising on the yacht Yampa with his wife and stepdaughter. Feeling recovered, he returned to the bank in October, but died at an elevated train station in New York City on November 12, 1894, at age 58. His funeral, at his former residence on 174th St. in Washington Hts. was attended by many financial giants of the day, including J. Pierpont Morgan (who acted as pallbearer), George Foster Peabody and William Rockefeller Jr.  He is buried at Woodlawn Cemetery in New York City.

Estate 

Upon his death, Wright's reputation as a prominent financier, railroad reorganizer, and confidant of the country's wealthy (including Thomas Edison) set off a media frenzy speculating on the size of his estate. Newspapers around the United States from New York City to Silver City, New Mexico published hypothetical stories describing his considerable legacy. In 1895 his nephews contested his will. At that time the NY Surrogate Court estimated Wright's fortune was $5 million in liquid assets and $300,000 in property. In March 1895, probate court agreed and set the final determination of the estate at $5 million in liquid assets and $300,000 in property, the majority of which went to his wife, sister and stepchildren.

Wright was instrumental in founding the Knickerbocker Hospital (J. Hood Wright Memorial Hospital) in New York's Manhattanville district by providing funds for its creation. He also served as the hospital's president, making a bequest of $500,000 to the hospital in his will.

Legacy

Wright donated the land in his will for the eponymous J. Hood Wright Park in New York City, located between 173rd street and 176th street from Fort Washington Avenue to Haven Avenue. His spacious house sat at the corner of 175th and Haven. The park consists of  that includes a playground displaying a model of the nearby George Washington Bridge, visible from the park basketball courts, ball fields, and recreation center.

He contributed generously to the Washington Heights Branch of New York's library system. An entrance plaque still honors his financial assistance in changing the library from fee-based to a free library. After his death, the Knickerbocker Hospital contested a grant to the library in Wright's will, saying the branch, absorbed by the New York Public Library, was not entitled to a bequest. The New York State Court of Appeals decided in 1916 that $100,000 was granted to the Washington Heights branch library as this fulfilled the terms of Wright's disposition of his will as a legacy.

Wright set up a $1,000,000 endowment trust fund for the Knickerbocker Hospital; designating that interest from the trust was to be used only for operating capital. In 1943, a judge allowed amounts to be taken from the fund principal to save the hospital from closing due to economic problems caused by World War II.

References

Sources 

1836 births
1894 deaths
Businesspeople from Philadelphia
American bankers
American financiers
Burials at Woodlawn Cemetery (Bronx, New York)
19th-century American businesspeople